In enzymology, an inositol 3-alpha-galactosyltransferase is an enzyme that catalyzes the chemical reaction

UDP-galactose + myo-inositol  UDP + O-alpha-D-galactosyl-(1->3)-1D-myo-inositol

Thus, the two substrates of this enzyme are UDP-galactose and myo-inositol, whereas its two products are UDP and [[O-alpha-D-galactosyl-(1->3)-1D-myo-inositol]].

This enzyme belongs to the family of glycosyltransferases, specifically the hexosyltransferases.  The systematic name of this enzyme class is UDP-galactose:myo-inositol 3-alpha-D-galactosyltransferase. Other names in common use include UDP-D-galactose:inositol galactosyltransferase, UDP-galactose:myo-inositol 1-alpha-D-galactosyltransferase, UDPgalactose:myo-inositol 1-alpha-D-galactosyltransferase, galactinol synthase, inositol 1-alpha-galactosyltransferase, and uridine diphosphogalactose-inositol galactosyltransferase.  This enzyme participates in galactose metabolism.

References

 

EC 2.4.1
Enzymes of unknown structure